Eric Höweler (born 1972) is a Chinese-Dutch architect and designer. Höweler is an associate professor in architecture at the Harvard University Graduate School of Design, where he teaches lecture courses and design studios with a focus on building technologies/integration since 2008. In 2004, Höweler founded Höweler+Yoon Architecture with partner Meejin Yoon.

Education and early career
Höweler was born in Cali, Colombia, and studied architecture at Cornell University, where he received both his Bachelor of Architecture and Master of Architecture. From 1996 to 2003 Höweler worked at Kohn Pedersen Fox, where he served as an Associate Principal on several large-scale buildings, including the Gannett USA Headquarters (McLean, Virginia), the 32-storey mixed-use Chater House (Hong Kong), and the 118-storey International Commerce Center in Hong Kong. Höweler worked as a senior designer for Diller+Scofidio (now Diller Scofidio + Renfro) from 2003 to 2005, where he worked on institutional and cultural projects, including the Institute of Contemporary Art (Boston) and the public space design at Lincoln Center for the Performing Arts (New York City).

Professional work
Höweler established Höweler+Yoon Architecture in 2004 with partner Meejin Yoon. The firm is an international interdisciplinary design practice working across the domains of architecture, urban design, public space, immersive experience, and design strategy. Höweler + Yoon Architecture is based out of Boston, Massachusetts. Notable works include Sky Courts Exhibition Hall (Chengdu, China), the MIT Collier Memorial (Cambridge, Massachusetts) and the Boston Society of Architects Headquarters (Boston).

Academic work

Höweler is an associate professor of architecture at the Harvard Graduate School of Design. Höweler is the author of Expanded Practice (with Meejin Yoon, Princeton Architectural Press, 2009); Skyscraper: Vertical Now (Rizzoli/Universe Publishers, 2003), Public Works, Unsolicited Small Projects for the Big Dig (with Meejin Yoon and Meredith Miller, MAP Book Publishers, 2009) and 1001 Skyscrapers (with Meejin Yoon, Princeton Architectural Press, 2000). Höweler has published essays and articles in Perspecta, Archis, Thresholds, Log, Architectural Record, The Architect’s Newspaper, Architectural Lighting, and Praxis.

Awards
Höweler's work has received numerous notable design awards, including the Audi Urban Future Award in 2012, United States Artists Award in Architecture and Design in 2008, and Architectural Record’s Design Vanguard Award in 2007.

References

1972 births
Living people
21st-century American architects
Cornell University alumni
Harvard Graduate School of Design faculty
20th-century American architects